See also List of bare-knuckle boxers
List of bare-knuckle lightweight champions is a chronological from England and the United States.  In some cases, the champions and their reigns can be disputed.  The purpose of this list is an attempt to chronicle the evolution of the lightweight division.

See also
List of bare-knuckle boxers

References

 
Lightweight boxers
Lists of boxing champions